Archaeolepadomorpha is an extinct order of barnacles in the class Thecostraca. There are at least 3 families and more than 40 described species in Archaeolepadomorpha.

Families
These families belong to the order Archaeolepadomorpha:
 Archaeolepadidae Gale, 2019
 Myolepadidae Gale, 2015 in Gale & Sørensen, 2015
 Stramentidae Withers, 1920

References

Barnacles